HMS Bryony was an  sloop of the Royal Navy, built at the yards of Armstrong Whitworth and launched on 27 October 1917.

She was used to escort convoys during the First World War, and in common with other ships of her class, was disguised as a merchant vessel, known as a Q-ship.  After the war she remained in service with the Royal Navy and between 7 April 1933 and January 1934, she was commanded by Bernard Warburton-Lee, later to posthumously be awarded a Victoria Cross in the Second World War.

She was decommissioned before the outbreak of the Second World War and was sold on 3 April 1938 to Cashmore, of Newport, Monmouthshire to be broken up.

References

Jane's Fighting Ships of World War One (1919), Jane's Publishing Company

Anchusa-class sloops
1917 ships
Ships built by Armstrong Whitworth